The definition of a million-selling single, as regarded by the Official Charts Company (OCC), has changed in line with new technology for music consumption. Originally only physical record sales were counted since the start of the UK Singles Chart in November 1952. Digital downloads of a track were included from 2004 onwards and from 2014 onwards BPI-certified awards (Silver, Gold and Platinum) and the weekly charts include audio streaming. In 2017, the OCC included streaming in their definition of a million-seller and published a full list of the 311 songs which had achieved this. Certified awards can also include shipments (sales to trade). The OCC and Music Week regularly announce when a record becomes a million seller.

History
In 1959, British periodical Disc introduced an initiative to present a Gold record to singles that sold more than 1 million units. Information about when a record was classified Gold by Disc is "not well documented", and the awards relied on record companies correctly compiling and supplying sales information. This led to errors, such as The Shadows' instrumental "Apache" and The Archies' "Sugar, Sugar" incorrectly being awarded a gold disc in January 1970. Such inaccuracies led to the instigation of an official classification system. In April 1973, the British Phonographic Industry (BPI) began classifying singles and albums by the number of units sold. The highest threshold is "Platinum record" and was then awarded to singles that sold more than 1 million units. For singles released after 1 January 1989, the number of sales required to qualify for Platinum, Gold and Silver records was dropped to 600,000 units (Platinum), 400,000 units (Gold) and 200,000 units (Silver). In February 1987, the BPI introduced multi-Platinum awards so that if a single sold 1,200,000 units it was classified as double Platinum, 1,800,000 units as triple Platinum, etc.

Digital downloads have been counted towards singles sales from 2004 onwards: the first single to achieve a million digital sales was "I Gotta Feeling" by the Black Eyed Peas. Additionally, audio streaming has been included in the official chart and BPI awards since 30 June 2014, at a rate of 100 streams representing one unit sale; however, the OCC still compiles a 'sales' (only) chart.

In 1963, the Beatles' song "She Loves You" became the best-selling single of all time in the UK. This record was broken in 1977 when Paul McCartney's subsequent band Wings surpassed it with "Mull of Kintyre", which also became the first song to sell 2 million copies in the UK. In 1984, Band Aid released the charity-record "Do They Know It's Christmas?" in response to the famine in Ethiopia; it sold 1 million copies in the first week and soon became the best-selling single. This record was broken in 1997, following the death of Diana, Princess of Wales, when Elton John released "Candle in the Wind 1997", a re-write of the Marilyn Monroe tribute released in 1973. Selling more than 650,000 copies on its first day on sale and more than 1.5 million in its first week, it quickly became the UK's best-selling single. It was classified by the BPI as 9× Platinum (5.4 million) in October 1997, but more recent reports by the OCC put its total sales at 4.93 million.

Million-selling singles (paid-for sales)
The following list is restricted to paid-for sales since the inception of a UK chart in 1952. Unless stated otherwise, sales figures from the OCC are correct as of 19 September 2017. At this date, the OCC started recording million-sellers using combined sales (including streaming), but published the paid-for sales figures as well.

, 179 singles have sold 1 million copies in the UK. Of these, 112 were originally released in the 20th century (70 of them selling 1 million before the year 2000) and the remainder were released between 2000 and 2014. The most recently released single to become a million-seller is "Uptown Funk" by Mark Ronson featuring Bruno Mars, which was released in December 2014 and passed a million sales ten weeks later in February 2015. Bing Crosby's "White Christmas" is the earliest release: originally 1942, although only sales from 1952 onwards are counted. The year in which the most million-sellers were released is 2011, with fifteen; while a record 40 releases in the 2010s have sold a million copies.

Although "Brown Girl in the Ring" was listed as the B-side, it received extensive airplay, which caused the single to peak in the charts for a second time.

Artists with the most million-selling singles
Twenty-five artists have had at least two million-selling singles in the UK (if John Travolta and Olivia Newton-John are counted as one artist), but only six artists have had more than two: The Beatles, who have six; Rihanna, who has four (including one as a featured artist); Adele, Bruno Mars, Pharrell Williams and Whitney Houston, who all have three (including one for Mars as a featured artist and two for Williams as a featured artist).

  Includes featured performances
  Duets

Songs with one million combined sales
This is a list of singles which have reached a million combined sales when streaming is taken into account (100 streams equivalent to one download or physical sale). In addition to those 175 listed above, at least 137 songs have achieved one million combined sales, according to a list published by the OCC in September 2017. Nineteen of these were released before 2000 and twenty-seven in 2015. The most combined sales (and only song with over 2 million streaming equivalent sales) without a million traditional sales, is "Shape of You" by Ed Sheeran.

In the full list of 312 songs with combined sales of over a million, Rihanna features as a named artist on 10 and Sheeran features on 9.

Since the publication of the 'millionaires' by the Official Charts Company in September 2017, many other songs have been revealed as 'millionaires' through announcements on their website as well as the announcement by the British Phonographic Industry (BPI) of BPI Brit Certified Awards. Songs which have been awarded a 2× Platinum award have combined sales in excess of 1.2 million copies. The following songs have achieved a multi-platinum certification from the BPI since September 2017:

See also
 List of best-selling singles in the United Kingdom
 List of most streamed songs in the United Kingdom
 List of Platinum singles in the United Kingdom awarded before 2000
 List of Platinum singles in the United Kingdom awarded since 2000

Footnotes

References

Million-selling